Tabernacle is a small village on the northeast coast of the island of Saint Kitts, in Saint Kitts and Nevis.

It is the birthplace of the Saint Kitts and Nevis' current prime minister Timothy Harris.

References

Populated places in Saint Kitts and Nevis